The following is a list of mountains of the Faroes. Note, however, that several mountains have more than one peak. However, only the tallest peak is counted in this table.

References

 German Wikipedia:Liste der Berge auf den Färöern

Faroe Islands
Mountains
Faroe Islands